Burlacul is a Romanian reality television dating game show debuting in 2010 on Antena 1. The first season was hosted by Lucian Marinescu, in season 2 he was replaced by host and designer Cătălin Botezatu. From season 6 onwards, the series will be hosted by Răzvan Fodor. There is one related series: Burlăcița who was Andreea Mantea in 2014  and Bianca Drăgușanu in 2011.

Plot
The series revolves around a single bachelor (deemed eligible) and a pool of romantic interests (22 in season 1, 21 in season 2 and 20 in seasons 3 & 4), which could include a potential wife for the bachelor. The conflicts in the series, both internal and external, stem from the elimination-style format of the show. Early in the season, the bachelor goes on large group dates with the women, with the majority of women eliminated during rose ceremonies. As the season progresses, women are also eliminated on one-on-one dates and on elimination two-on-one dates. The process culminates with hometown visits to the families of the final four women, overnight dates, should they choose to accept, at exotic locations with the final three women, and interaction with the bachelor's family with the final two or three women. In many cases, the bachelor proposes to his final selection.
The show is known for its dramatic twists, both structurally and contextually. In some cases, the bachelor may or may not follow the show's standard rose ceremony guidelines. Some bachelors, for instance, have conferred fewer roses than allotted as per standard rose ceremony procedure.

The elimination process
According to the summary on Antena 1, each new Bachelor episode contains a rose ceremony during which one or more contestants is eliminated. Eliminations are based upon date performance (i.e., how the women relate to the bachelor on the dates). The bachelor must follow a process of elimination wherein his pool of bachelorettes is narrowed down week by week by presenting a rose to each of the women he wishes to keep.
At any point during the process, if a woman decides she is no longer interested in the bachelor, she may leave. A few have actually done so over the course of the show.
In the end, the bachelor may select only one woman for the final rose, but in season 3 all remaining contestants refused the rose and the original bachelor (Vladimir Drăghia) was eliminated.

Season synopses

Notes

Series guide

Series 1 (2010)
The first series aired on Antena 1 from 8 July to 2 September 2010.

Bachelor: Cătălin Botezatu
WINNER: Violeta Babliuc

Series 2 (2011)
The second series aired on Antena 1 from 28 April to 23 June 2011.

Bachelor: Eduard Popescu Strohlen
WINNER: Ana Maria Savu

Series 3 (2012)
The third series aired on Antena 1 from 1 March to 17 May 2012.

Bachelor: Sergiu Barboni (replaced Vladimir Drăghia after his elimination)
WINNER: Adelina Boe

Series 4 (2013)
The fourth series aired on Antena 1 from 4 July.

Bachelor: Bogdan Vlădau
WINNER: Daciana Ciochina

Series 5 (2015)
The fifth series aired on Antena 1 from 15 January.

Bachelor: Andrei Andrei
WINNER: None

Series 6 (TBA)
The sixth series will air on Antena 1.

Bachelor: Andy Constantin
WINNER: TBA

Controversies
As a worldwide The Bachelor premiere, when Vladimir Drăghia, the original bachelor was eliminated by contestants. Drăghia was replaced by male model Sergiu Barboni in next episode.

Bachelors
 Season 1 - Cătălin Botezatu 
 Season 2 - Eduard Popescu Strohlen 
 Season 3 - Vladimir Drăghia (eliminated) 
 Season 3 - Sergiu Barboni 
 Season 4 - Bogdan Vlădău
 Season 5 - Andrei Andrei

References

2010 Romanian television series debuts
Antena 1 (Romania) original programming
2010s Romanian television series
Romanian reality television series
Romania
Romanian television series based on American television series